The Golden Book Magazine, was an American magazine publishing short fiction that ran from January 1925 to 1935. Based in New York City, the magazine was published on a monthly basis. The publisher was Review of Reviews Corporation. In October 1935 the magazine merged with Fiction Parade; Fiction Parade and Golden Book ceased publication in 1938.

References

External links
July 1925 issue Full issue online

Monthly magazines published in the United States
Defunct literary magazines published in the United States
Magazines established in 1925
Magazines disestablished in 1938
Magazines published in New York City